Thomas Carter Wilson (20 October 1877 – 30 August 1940) was an English footballer who played as a forward. Born in Preston, he played for Manchester United, Ashton-in-Makerfield, West Manchester, Ashton Town, Ashton North End, Oldham County, Swindon Town, Blackburn Rovers, Millwall Athletic, Queen's Park Rangers, Aston Villa, Bolton Wanderers and Leeds City.

External links
MUFCInfo.com profile

1877 births
1940 deaths
English footballers
Manchester United F.C. players
Ashton Town A.F.C. players
Swindon Town F.C. players
Blackburn Rovers F.C. players
Millwall F.C. players
Queens Park Rangers F.C. players
Aston Villa F.C. players
Bolton Wanderers F.C. players
Leeds City F.C. players
Association football forwards